Eastwind Ridge is a broad, partially ice-covered ridge about  long between Chattahoochee Glacier and Towle Glacier in the Convoy Range of Antarctica. It was mapped by the United States Geological Survey from ground surveys and Navy air photos, and was named by the Advisory Committee on Antarctic Names in 1964 for the USCGC Eastwind, an icebreaker in several American convoys into McMurdo Sound since the 1958–59 season.

References 

Ridges of Victoria Land
Scott Coast